Albert Kivikas ( in Groß-St. Johannis, Livonia, Russian Empire – 19 May 1978 in Lund) was an Estonian writer and journalist. He is best known as the author of the book Names in Marble, the subject of which is the Estonian War of Independence.

Life 
Albert Kivikas was born in Suure-Jaani, which at the time was part of the Russian Empire. His mother Anu Kivikas was a weaver. In his youth he published some of his works under the names A. Pedajas and Mart Karus. After the Estonian War of Independence, in which he participated as a volunteer, Kivikas became one of the few writers in Estonia to experiment with futurism. However, his best works are novels and short stories dealing with war and social problems in the rural environment.

From 1941 to 1944 he served as a chairman of the Estonian Writers' Union. In spring 1944, Kivikas went into exile in Finland and from there in autumn 1944 on to Sweden where he lived till the end of his life.

1898 births
1978 deaths
People from Suure-Jaani
People from Kreis Fellin
Estonian male novelists
Estonian male short story writers
Estonian journalists
20th-century Estonian novelists
20th-century short story writers
20th-century male writers
20th-century journalists
University of Tartu alumni
Estonian military personnel of the Estonian War of Independence
Estonian World War II refugees
Estonian emigrants to Sweden
Burials at Metsakalmistu